Mutya Han Samar 2005 was the 26th annual Samar beauty pageant, held at Samar Provincial Gymnasium in Catbalogan on August 9, 2006. Twenty-three contestants competed. Sharon del Castillo Sabarre of the Calbiga crowned her successor Julie Ann Ortega of Calbayog at the end of this event. The evening show was jointly hosted by former Samar Beauty Queens Jocelyn Lim-Casiano (Mutya han Samar 1994), Pearly Dawn Sabarre (Mutya han Samar 1997) and Apple Joyce Cruto (Miss Basey 2004). Actor Joross Gamboa was a segment host of the show.

Results

Placements

Special Awards

Judges
 Jun Reyes
 Capt. Cromwell Danganan
 Dr. Leo Lofranco
 Judge Roberto Navidad
 Felix Hilvano
 Sarah Españo
 Engr. Opiñano

2005 beauty pageants
2005 in the Philippines
Culture of Samar (province)